Apsethus the Libyan (2nd century AD) was an occultist. Despite repeated intrigues, he failed to become god. Multiple accounts mentioned his mystic and occult skills.

Desire of God 
Apsethus attempted to prove that he was divine, leading to claims that he desired to become God. He was compared with Simon Magus.

As occult 
Apsethus trained parrots that flew around Northern Africa. They would utter the phrase "Apsethus is God". Apsethus asserted himself to be God. The Libyans sacrificed to Apsethus, as they started believing him to be a voice from Heaven.
Later a Greek caught one of these parrots. He trained the parrot to say, "Apsethus having caged us, compelled us to say Apsethus is a god". The Libyans later burned Apsethus.

See also 
 List of occultists

References

External links 
 SIMONIANISM
 Chapter III.—Story of Apsethus the Libyan

Occultists
Ancient Libyans
2nd-century people